This list of the tallest buildings and structures in Edinburgh ranks buildings in the Scottish city of Edinburgh by height. There are few high-rise buildings in Edinburgh. The tallest buildings in the city are churches and suburban tower blocks. The administrative area of Edinburgh includes the three bridges across the Firth of Forth to the north-east of the city (the Queensferry Crossing, Forth Road Bridge and Forth Bridge), which are all taller than any building in the city itself.

Tallest buildings in Edinburgh 
This list ranks externally complete Edinburgh buildings and free-standing structures that stand more than 50 metres (164 ft) tall, based on standard height measurement. This includes spires and architectural details but does not include antenna masts. An equals sign (=) following a rank indicates the same height between two or more buildings. The "Year" column indicates the year in which a building was completed. Buildings that have been demolished (including the 365ft chimney of Portobello Power Station) are not included. Some prominent Edinburgh buildings such as St Giles' Cathedral, North Leith Parish Church, Appleton Tower, Mayfield Salisbury Church, West Register House and St John's Portobello are just below this threshold, as are the Melville Monument and numerous residential tower blocks at Craigmillar, Craigour, Greendykes, Lochend, Moredun, Muirhouse, Restalrig and the Calders.

Tallest structures in Edinburgh

See also
List of tallest buildings and structures in Glasgow

References 

 
Tallest buildings in Edinburgh
Bui